Tangsir is a film directed by Amir Naderi. Behrouz Vossoughi is the leading actor playing the role of Zar Mohammad (or Shir Mohammad). This film was based on a novel written by Sadeq Chubak. Tangsir is set in the southwestern Iranian coastal province of Bushehr around 1935.

Cast 
 Behrouz Vossoughi
 Nouri Kasrai
 Parviz Fannizadeh
 Jafar Vali
 Enayat Bakhshi
 Noori Kasra'i
 Mehri Vedadian
 Hossein Amirfazli

Reception
Hengameh nahid said of the film, "a memorable and acceptable film that has no expiration date."
Naderi's film evokes emotive feelings about justice, honor, patriotism, and revenge

References

External links 
 

1974 films
Films based on works by Sadeq Chubak
Films directed by Amir Naderi
Films set in 1935
Iranian historical films
1970s Persian-language films
1970s historical action films
Films about revenge
1970s vigilante films
Films based on Iranian novels